Roman Horak may refer to:

Roman Horák (ice hockey, born 1969), retired Czech professional ice hockey player who played 14 seasons in the European Elite leagues
Roman Horák (ice hockey, born 1991), his son, Czech ice hockey player playing for the Växjö Lakers of the Swedish Hockey League

See also
Horak (surname)